XMR may refer to: 

 Monero, code XMR, a decentralized cryptocurrency
 X Motor Racing, a motor racing game for Windows
 Meroitic language, ISO 639-3 language code XMR 
 Cape Canaveral Space Force Station, FAA LID XMR

See also
 Xenotropic murine leukemia virus–related virus (XMRV)
 XM Satellite Radio